Amon Fasileau-Duplantier, known as Monsieur Amon (22 December 1849 – 24 February 1915), was a French coffee and urban real estate entrepreneur established in Costa Rica.  Monsieur Amon commercial activities had a deep impact on the Costa Rican society of the latest 19th century due to the foundation of San José's Belle Époque neighborhood which carries his name today as the Barrio Amón.  The image of Monsieur Amon is associated to Costa Rican coffee golden age.

Life 
Monsieur Amon was born in Bordeaux.  He arrived to Costa Rica in his mid-twenties to work in The Tournon Company, owned by his brother- in-law, Mr. Hippolyte Tournon.  The company already produced and exported coffee; Monsieur Amon was entrusted to manage the firm and became a respected local figure with a key influence in the social and economic spheres.  He started the diversification to urban real estate and electricity production at the time Minor Keith developed similar activities, leveraging the Atlantic railroad construction and growing banana trade.  Monsieur Amon left Costa Rica to France in 1899 after being replaced by his nephew, and son of Mr. Hippolyte Tournon: Elois Tournon, as the head of the Tournon Company.

References 
Lemistre, Annie. “Amon El Incognito".  First Edition.  San José, Costa Rica. May 2015.

1849 births
1915 deaths
Costa Rican businesspeople
Belle Époque